The 1930–31 season was Real Sociedad's third season in La Liga.

This article shows player statistics and all matches that the club played during the 1930–31 season.

Players

Player stats

League

League matches

League position

Cup

External links
 Real Sociedad Squad
 All fixtures listed

References

Real Sociedad seasons
Spanish football clubs 1930–31 season